Jim Houlihan (1898–1967) was an Irish sportsperson. He played hurling with his local club Tulla and was a member of the Clare senior inter-county team in the 1920s and 1930s.

References

1898 births
1967 deaths
Tulla (Clare) hurlers
Clare inter-county hurlers
Munster inter-provincial hurlers